The Laurence Olivier Award for Best New Dance Production is an annual award presented by the Society of London Theatre in recognition of achievements in commercial London theatre. The awards were established as the Society of West End Theatre Awards in 1976, and renamed in 1984 in honour of English actor and director Laurence Olivier.

This award was first presented in 1983, as Outstanding New Dance Production of the Year. After the 1985 presentation, the award was set aside from 1986 to 1992, returning in 1993 under its current name.

Winners and nominees

1980s

1990s

2000s

2010s

2020s

References

External links
 

Dance Production